Collocheres is a genus of copepods in the family Asterocheridae.

References

External links 

 

Siphonostomatoida
Copepod genera